Shri Bhausaheb Hire Government Medical College (SBHGMC) is a medical institution in Dhule, Maharashtra, India. It is affiliated to the Maharashtra University of Health Sciences and recognised by the Medical Council of India. It was established in 1989 and was previously affiliated with Pune University and later with North Maharashtra University.

SBHGMC principally offers the MBBS medical degree (Bachelor of Medicine Bachelor of Surgery).  Post-graduate courses are not offered but will be available shortly . It has a total Undergraduate student intake capacity of 150.

Students come from all over India. The division of seats for students from the state of Maharashtra and the rest of India is subject to change, but has been:
Students from NEET (National Eligibility cum Entrance test): 85% Domicile of Maharashtra and 15% All India Students

The campus is located on the outskirts of Dhule city.

The hospital attached to the college is Government Hospital, Dhule, also known as Civil Hospital, Dhule. It has 545 beds and is a major hospital in Dhule district, treating approximately 600 patients a day, many from rural areas.

History and formation

Facilities

References

External links
 Official website

Medical colleges in Maharashtra
Dhule
Educational institutions established in 1989
1989 establishments in Maharashtra
Affiliates of Maharashtra University of Health Sciences